Emiliano Fenu (b. Siniscola on January 29, 1977) is an Italian politician. He is a Senator of the XVIII legislature of Italy for the 5 Star Movement. He is a member of the 6th Standing Committee (Finance and Treasury) since 21 June 2018. He is also a member of Parliamentary Supervisory Commission on the Tax Register since 29 November 2018.

References 

Living people
1977 births
21st-century Italian politicians
Senators of Legislature XVIII of Italy
Deputies of Legislature XIX of Italy
People from the Province of Nuoro